Ironeus is a genus of beetles in the family Cerambycidae, containing the following species:

 Ironeus duplex Bates, 1872
 Ironeus mutatus Bates, 1885
 Ironeus pulcher Bates, 1880

References

Elaphidiini